Cleobora is a monotypic genus of ladybird native to Tasmania and the southern states of mainland Australia. Its only recognized species is Cleobora mellyi, the Tasmanian ladybird or southern ladybird.

C. mellyi was introduced to New Zealand in 1977 as a biological control agent, with mixed results.

References

External links

 Cleobora mellyi at the Atlas of Living Australia

Coccinellidae
Beetles of Australia
Beetles described in 1850

Coccinellidae genera